ZMC is a private equity investment firm based in Manhattan, founded by Strauss Zelnick.

ZMC can also refer to:

 ZMC (airship), naval designation for metal-clad airship
 ISO 693-3 code for Margany language, a dialect of Bidjara language
 Zunyi Medical College, medical college in Guizhou, China
 ZENN Motor Company, Canadian electric vehicle company
 Zygomatico-maxillary complex, a human bony facial structure
 Zak Mal Coiffé, a lil' prostitute